The Charm of La Bohème is a 1937 Austrian musical film directed by Géza von Bolváry and starring Jan Kiepura, Mártha Eggerth, and Paul Kemp. It follows the plot of Giacomo Puccini's 1896 opera La bohème. The film's sets were designed by Hans Ledersteger. The Berlin premiere took place at the Ufa-Palast am Zoo.

Cast

References

External links

Austrian musical films
1937 musical films
Films directed by Géza von Bolváry
Films set in Paris
Films based on operas
Films about singers
Austrian black-and-white films
Films scored by Robert Stolz